Stefan van Dam (born 3 March 1983) is a Dutch former professional footballer who played as a midfielder.

Club career
Van Dam played in the youth of VV Sliedrecht, until moving to Willem II. He played his first professional game for Willem II in the Eredivisie in De Kuip. After two first team caps his contract was not renewed.

In summer 2004, Van Dam moved to TOP Oss. Here he experienced a good start with three goals in his first two games. After playing seven games his contract was not renewed.

Next he played in the first team of ASWH. In March 2010 he left for Kozakken Boys and a year later he rejoined Sliedrecht. In Sliedrecht he was the captain of team and played until summer 2017.

After his playing career, Van Dam started as a manager. He coached a youth team and the reserves of Sliedrecht and also worked as assistant-manager of the first team. In 2022 Van Dam moved to former club ASWH as assistant-manager.

International career
While playing for ASWH he also played in the Netherlands Amateur Football Team that was dismantled in 2007.

References

1983 births
Living people
People from Sliedrecht
Dutch footballers
Eredivisie players
Eerste Divisie players
Willem II (football club) players
TOP Oss players
ASWH players
Kozakken Boys players
Association football midfielders
Footballers from South Holland